Dan Lebental is an American film editor who has edited many films for the Marvel Cinematic Universe.

Selected filmography
 Mortal Kombat (2021)
 Bad Boys for Life (2020)
 Spider-Man: Far From Home (2019)
 Ant-Man and the Wasp (2018)
 Spider-Man: Homecoming (2017)
 CHiPs (2017)
 Term Life (2016)
 Ant-Man (2015)
 Thor: The Dark World (2013)
 Cowboys & Aliens (2011)
 Iron Man 2 (2010)
 Couples Retreat (2009)
 Iron Man (2008)
 The Woods (2006)
 The Break-Up (2006)
 Zathura: A Space Adventure (2005)
 Elf (2003)
 11:14 (2003)
 From Hell (2001)
 Happy Campers (2001)
 Where the Money Is (2000)
 Very Bad Things (1998)
 Deceiver (1997)
 Dead Presidents (1995)

External links

References

Living people
American film editors
Year of birth missing (living people)